General Colby may refer to:

Anthony Colby (1792–1873), New Hampshire Militia major general
Leonard Wright Colby (1846–1924), U.S. Army brigadier general
Thomas Frederick Colby